F-liiga is the highest-tier of floorball for women in Finland. The league was founded as Salibandyn naisten SM-sarja (English: Women's Floorball Finnish Championship) in 1988 by the Finnish Floorball Federation (SSBL). The former name, Naisten Salibandyliiga, was introduced for the 2000–01 season and its current name for the 2020–21 season. The F-liiga is operated by SSBL Salibandy Oy, a limited corporation owned entirely by the Finnish Floorball Federation.

History
SC Classic took their 8th title in the 2014-15 season of Naisten Salibandyliiga after beating SB Pro 3-0 in the final series. NST took the third place after beating Happee 10-1 in the bronze medal game.
TPS were able the retain their spot in the league by beating Crackers 3-2 in the relegation series. Steelers lost their relegation series against Joutsenon Kataja 2-3 and so Kataja won promotion along with  straightly promoted First Division winners 02-Jyväskylä. SB Vantaa were also relegated due to finishing last in the regular season.

Current teams
Updated for the 2022–23 season

Group A 
 TPS, Turku
 FBC Loisto, Turku
 PSS, Porvoo
 EräViikingit, Helsinki
 Classic, Tampere
 Koovee, Tampere
 SB-Pro, Nurmijärvi
 SSRA, Oulu

Group B 
 SaiPa, Lappeenranta
 Helsinki United, Helsinki
 Jokerit, Helsinki
 O2-Jyväskylä, Jyväskylä
 Welhot, Kuopio
 ÅIF, Sipoo
 Pirkat, Pirkkala
 Blue Fox, Uusikaarlepyy

Recent champions

Updated as of the 2021–22 season

List of champions

Updated as of the 2021–22 season

Records

Regular season

Game records

 Highest attendance : 693
 Classic vs. Happee (13–2), 02-19-2011
 Biggest home win: 18–0
 SB Pro vs. Sheriffs (18–0), 01-30-2013
 Biggest away win: 1–23
 SSV vs. Erä III (1–23), 02-18-2006
 Highest scoring game: 24 goals
 Josba vs. PE Åland (19–5), 01-06-2006

Individual records

Career

 Most games played: 346
 Maria Repo
Most goals: 365
 Katariina Saarinen
 Most assists: 244
 Katariina Saarinen
 Most points: 609
 Katariina Saarinen

Season

Most goals: 56
  Eliisa Alanko (Classic), 2012–13
Most assists: 68
  Elina Kujala (SB Pro), 2013–14
 Most points: 83
  Elina Kujala (SB Pro), 2013–14

Playoffs

Game records

 Highest attendance : 1039
 NST vs. Classic (5–4), 04-07-2006
 Biggest win: 15–0
 Classic vs. PSS (14–2), 03-12-2011
 Highest scoring game: 17 goals
 VFT vs. Josba (14–3), 03-05-2004

Individual records

Career

 Most games played: 140
  Katriina Saarinen
Most goals: 118
 Katriina Saarinen
 Most assists: 73
  Niina Rantala
 Most points: 190
  Katriina Saarinen

Season

Most goals: 19
  Eliisa Alanko (Classic), 2012–13
Most assists: 17
  Niina Rantala (Classic), 2012–13
 Most points: 29
  Petra Mäntynen (Classic), 2002–03

All records updated as of season 2013-14.

References

External links
 Official website 
 fliiga.com – F-liiga 
 Finnish Floorball Federation 

Floorball competitions in Finland
Sports leagues in Finland
1988 establishments in Finland
Sports leagues established in 1988
Women's sports leagues in Finland